Per Olof (P. O.) Sundelin is a Swedish bridge player.

Bridge accomplishments

Wins 
 North American Bridge Championships (6)
 Senior Knockout Teams (3) 2001, 2002, 2008 
 Nail Life Master Open Pairs (1) 1984 
 Truscott Senior Swiss Teams (2) 1998, 2001

Runners-up 

 North American Bridge Championships (2)
 Senior Knockout Teams (1) 1997 
 Jacoby Open Swiss Teams (1) 1991

Notes

External links 
 
 

Swedish contract bridge players
Living people
Year of birth missing (living people)